Vestura is a monotypic moth genus of the family Erebidae erected by Charles Swinhoe in 1904. Its only species, Vestura minereusalis, was first described by Francis Walker in 1859. It is found in Borneo, Sumatra and Singapore.

References

Calpinae
Monotypic moth genera